The English Expedition to Algiers occurred between 1620 and 1621, it was a naval attack ordered by King James with the goal of ending Muslim piracy.

King James of England ordered a naval attack against Algiers aiming to put an end to Muslim piracy. 

On 27 November in the year 1620, Mansell arrived at Algiers with 20 ships and formally demanded that the Dey of Algiers surrender all of the English subjects, all of the English vessels and he also demanded the execution or capture of all of the pirates who had taken them. The Algerians pretended to show eagerness to comply with his demands and released some four-and-twenty captives. Mansell was aware that this was a small amount since the Algerians had captured 150 English vessels in the past six years, however he was not prepared to fight and sailed away. 

On 21 May, he returned to Algiers and three days later launched his attack. The English launched their fireships against the pirate shipping, flames were seen shooting up in no less than seven places amongst the rigging. The English were low on ammunition and the Algerians took advantage, the Algerians hurried back and drove of the English. The failure of the English expedition was complete.

English ships

Citations

References

 

17th century in Algeria
Wars involving Algeria
Wars involving England
1620 in England
1621 in England